The American Journal of Science (AJS) is the United States of America's longest-running scientific journal, having been published continuously since its conception in 1818 by Professor Benjamin Silliman, who edited and financed it himself. Until 1880, it was also known as the American Journal of Science and Arts, but its focus was always on natural sciences and especially on geology and related subjects.

In early years, the journal was often referred to as "Silliman's Journal", and the publication became associated with Yale University due to his long tenure there (1804–1853). The editorship long remained in the family of Professor Silliman, as he was assisted by his son, Benjamin Silliman Jr., from 1838. On the death of the elder Silliman in 1864, he was succeeded as chief editor by his son-in-law, James Dwight Dana, and then from 1895 till 1926 by Dana's son Edward Salisbury Dana. Associate editors included the botanist Asa Gray and the zoologist Louis Agassiz.

The current editors are Mark T. Brandon, professor at Yale University, and C. Page Chamberlain, professor at Stanford University.

References

External links

American Journal of Science online
American Journal of Science (1818-1895) full text digital archive; and fulltext from HathiTrust
 

Geology journals
Academic journals published by non-profit publishers
1818 establishments in New Jersey